Eva von Gamm, née Neeb, ( 1933 – 3 April 2017) was a German pair skater and figure skating judge. With her skating partner, Karl Probst, she became a three-time West German national medalist and competed at five ISU Championships in the 1950s.

Personal life 
Eva von Gamm was born in Munich in the 1930s and had two children. She died in Munich on 3 April 2017.

Career 
Neeb and Probst trained together in Munich. They competed internationally for West Germany and finished on the national podium three times, winning silver in 1953 and 1956 and bronze in 1955. They competed at the 1953 European Championships in Dortmund, West Germany; 1953 World Championships in Davos, Switzerland; 1954 European Championships in Bolzano, Italy; 1956 European Championships in Paris, France; and 1956 World Championships in Garmisch-Partenkirchen, West Germany.

Neeb and Probst also competed in roller skating.

After retiring from competition, von Gamm became a lawyer and skating judge. She judged ladies' singles at the 1976 Winter Olympics in Innsbruck, Austria. She served as a judge for singles and pairs at multiple World Championships, including 1968, 1971, 1974, 1978, 1979, 1980, 1984, and 1986.

Competitive highlights 
with Probst

References 

1930s births
2017 deaths
Figure skating judges
German female pair skaters
Sportspeople from Munich